Hiba Nawab is an Indian television actress. She made her acting debut as a child artist in Ssshhhh...Phir Koi Hai and her first role as an adult was in Crazy Stupid Ishq, where she was seen as Anushka 'Pampi' Atwal.

Nawab had her breakthrough with the portrayal of Amaya Mathur in Tere Sheher Mein. She is also known for her role of Elaichi Bansal Khurana in Jijaji Chhat Per Hain.

She is portraying Sayuri Sharma Choudhary in Woh Toh Hai Albelaa since March 2022.

Career
Nawab made her acting debut as a child artist in Ssshhhh...Phir Koi Hai with the role of Dolly. Her next role was of Shweta Singh, Saloni's adoptive daughter in Saat Phere. Her last appearance as a child was in Lo Ho Gayi Pooja Iss Ghar Ki. She then took a break from acting.

In 2015, Nawab portrayed Amaya Mathur in Star Plus's Tere Sheher Mein. She also sang the reprised version of Dheere Dheere. From 2018-2020, she played Elaichi Bansal Khurana in SAB TV's Jijaji Chhat Per Hain for which she won the Indian Telly Award for Best Actor In Comic Role Female Popular. In 2021, Nawab was seen playing the double role of Connaught Place "CP" Sharma and Chandra Prabha in SAB TV's Jijaji Chhat Parr Koii Hai.

As of March 2022, Nawab is playing Sayuri Sharma in Woh Toh Hai Albelaa on Star Bharat opposite Shaheer Sheikh.

Media
In 2018, Nawab was listed in Times of India's Top 20 Most Desirable Women on Indian Television.

Filmography

Television

Music videos

Awards and nominations

See also
 List of Hindi television actresses

References

External links

 
 

Living people
Indian child actresses
Actresses in Hindi television
Indian television actresses
Indian soap opera actresses
21st-century Indian actresses
People from Bareilly
Year of birth missing (living people)